Maria Marfutina and Anastasia Zarycká were the defending champions, but Marfutina chose not to participate. Zarycká partnered Laura Ioana Paar but lost in the first round to Sofya Lansere and Kamilla Rakhimova.

Natela Dzalamidze and Nina Stojanović won the title, defeating Kyōka Okamura and Dejana Radanović in the final, 6–3, 6–3.

Seeds

Draw

Draw

References
Main Draw

Macha Lake Open - Doubles